Interstate 64 (I-64) in the US state of Virginia runs east–west through the middle of the state from West Virginia to the Hampton Roads region, for a total of . It is notable for crossing the mouth of the harbor of Hampton Roads on the Hampton Roads Bridge–Tunnel (HRBT), the first bridge–tunnel to incorporate artificial islands, concurrent with U.S. Route 60 (US 60). Also noteworthy is a section through Rockfish Gap, a wind gap in the Blue Ridge Mountains, which was equipped with an innovative system of airport-style runway lighting embedded into the pavement to aid motorists during periods of poor visibility due to fog or other conditions.

Route description

Alleghany County to Charlottesville 

I-64 enters Virginia as a four-lane divided highway, continuing its concurrency with US 60 through Covington into Lexington where the two routes split. From Lexington, I-64 then turns northward to Staunton, overlapping I-81 in the Shenandoah Valley. From Staunton, I-64 leaves I-81, passes through Waynesboro, crosses Rockfish Gap, and continues eastward, passing just to the south of Charlottesville, closely following the path of the historic colonial-era Three Notch'd Road, which had been established in the Colony of Virginia by the 1730s and was largely replaced in the 1930s by US 250. Just outside of Charlottesville in Zion Crossroads, I-64 received the state's first diverging diamond interchange at its interchange with US 15, which opened to traffic on February 21, 2014, and was completed on April 15, 2014.

Greater Richmond and the Virginia Peninsula
After Charlottesville, I-64 then turns more east-southeasterly and heads toward Richmond, passing through Fluvanna, Goochland, and Louisa counties. After entering Henrico County and the Greater Richmond Region, I-64 interchanges and overlaps with I-95 on a stretch of highway which was a part of the former Richmond–Petersburg Turnpike, passing near Downtown Richmond and through the historic Black neighborhood of Jackson Ward. Once on the south side of Downtown Richmond, I-64 diverges from its concurrency with I-95 and continues southeasterly down the Virginia Peninsula through New Kent County and the Historic Triangle, into Newport News.

This portion of I-64 was set up by the Virginia Department of Transportation (VDOT) with a contraflow lane reversal system in place in the event of a mass evacuation of the Hampton Roads area region due to a hurricane or other catastrophic event. Gates are installed at the eastbound I-64 entrance and exit ramps from exit 200 (I-295) to exit 273 (US 60 east of the HRBT), and crossover roads are in place near the aforementioned exits.

Hampton Roads Beltway 

About  before the southern interchange with State Route 199 (SR 199), I-64 becomes a six-lane divided highway as it continues toward Hampton Roads. Shortly after entering its interchange with SR 173 (Denbigh Boulevard), I-64 enters the Hampton Roads metropolitan area and widens out to an eight-lane divided highway, continuing generally south-southeasterly into Hampton where it meets the northern terminus of I-664 beginning the Inner Loop of the Hampton Roads Beltway. I-64 curves north-northeast to pass north of Downtown Hampton and cross the Hampton River, turning back southward to reach the Hampton Roads Bridge–Tunnel, which it utilizes to cross the main shipping channel at the entrance to the harbor of Hampton Roads from the Chesapeake Bay. Once on the Southside, I-64 turns south through Norfolk, passing the eastern boundary of Naval Station Norfolk and Chambers Field and the spur route supplying it, I-564. It then becomes a six-lane divided highway with a two-lane reversible roadway in the middle, which is used for HOV traffic during morning and afternoon rush hours. It continues through Norfolk, curving multiple times and eventually ending up heading due south as it passes the interchange with another of its spur routes, I-264 on the northwest side of Virginia Beach.

After I-264, there are no more directional markers on I-64 from here to its "eastern" terminus because I-64 "east" will actually head west after its current southward course, and vice-versa. From I-264 to its "eastern" terminus, it is simply only signed as I-64 and either the Inner and Outer loop of the Hampton Roads Beltway.

Shortly after the I-264 interchange, I-64 leaves Virginia Beach for the city of Chesapeake. It soon comes to a complex interchange between another of its spur routes, I-464, along with US 17 and SR 168. I-64, now running westward, crosses the Southern Branch Elizabeth River using the High Rise Bridge. The road then curves northwesterly and ends at Bower's Hill, where it meets both the western terminus of I-264 and the southern terminus of I-664 near the northeastern corner of the Great Dismal Swamp. I-64's lanes continue northbound as I-664 to Newport News across the Monitor–Merrimac Memorial Bridge–Tunnel (MMMBT), ending at I-64 in Hampton, completing the beltway.

History 
In early studies and proposals of the Interregional Highway System (the predecessor title of the Eisenhower Interstate System), I-64 was to use the US 250 alignment west of Richmond. However, in the late 1950s, a number of interested citizens, including Virginia Senator Mosby Perrow Jr., proposed that I-64 be realigned to run along US 220, US 460, SR 307, and US 360 from Clifton Forge via Cloverdale (near Roanoke), Lynchburg, and Farmville to Richmond. This southern route was favored by Governor J. Lindsay Almond and most members of the State Highway Commission.

The decision was on hold for three years while the state continued planning for the piece of the US 250 alignment from Richmond to Short Pump, which would be needed anyway to handle traffic. In 1961, US Secretary of Commerce Luther H. Hodges rejected that plan and chose the present route, leaving Lynchburg as the largest city in Virginia not served by an Interstate. Officially, the chosen route was considered more efficient. However, there is speculation that the decision involved "back-room" politics of the Kennedy administration.

Auxiliary routes 
I-64 has four auxiliary routes, all of which are in the Hampton Roads Area: 

 —A bypass route serving the Virginia Beach Oceanfront, Downtown Norfolk, and most of Portsmouth.
 —A connector route serving the western side of Chesapeake, Portsmouth, and Downtown Norfolk. It connects I-64 in Chesapeake to I-264 in Norfolk.
—A spur route serving Naval Station Norfolk.
—A bypass route serving Chesapeake, Suffolk, Newport News, and Hampton.

Both of the bypass routes are shorter than the main leg for through traffic—I-664 is about  shorter than the bypassed main leg while I-264 is about  shorter than the main leg it bypasses.

Accidents 

On December 22, 2019, around 69 cars were involved in a pileup on I-64 westbound at the Queen's Creek Bridge near exit 238 (SR 143 east). 51 injuries were reported, including two life-threatening. Per reports, ice and fog were seen at that time.

Current and future projects

I-64 widening projects 
Two segments on I-64 have been identified as candidates for widening: I-64 on the Virginia Peninsula from New Kent County to Newport News and I-64 in South Hampton Roads from the I-464/US 17/SR 168 interchange in Chesapeake to the Bowers Hill Interchange in Suffolk.

Peninsula

On the Peninsula, most of the I-64 corridor is a four-lane roadway and is one of the most-traveled segments in the region, connecting the Hampton Roads metropolitan area to the Greater Richmond Region. In recent years, the corridor has become a major bottleneck for traffic, with over half of the entire  stretch having failing or near failing levels of service and continued increased safety concerns. In 2011, VDOT initiated a study that would consider widening the highway with either additional general purpose lanes in the median and/or on the outside shoulder, adding two-lane, fully reversible managed lanes (either as a tolled express lane or an HOT-lane facility) or the addition of full tolling on the entire span. The approved plan selected by VDOT and partners included the plan that added an additional general purpose lane in each direction by either expanding into the median or on the outside shoulder. In June 2013, the Commonwealth Transportation Board (CTB) included $100 million (equivalent to $ in ) in funding for the project in its Six-Year Improvement Program, allowing the project to move forward into the design and build phases. The Hampton Roads Transportation Planning Organization (HRTPO) allocated an additional $44 million (equivalent to $ in ) to Segment I of the project to extend the boundaries beyond the Fort Eustis interchange. The project is broken down into three operationally independent segments, which are independently funded, designed and built by a different company.
 Segment I encompassed the portion of I-64 beginning west of SR 143 (Jefferson Avenue; exit 255) to just east of SR 238 (Yorktown Road; exit 247). Construction on this segment began in September 2015 and was completed December 1, 2017. It was managed by Shirley Contracting Company LLC at a total cost of $122 million (equivalent to $ in ).
Construction on this segment was managed by Alan Myers VA LLC and costed $138 million (equivalent to $ in ). Construction began in the autumn of 2016 and was completed in spring 2019.
Construction on this segment is managed by Shirley Contracting Company LLC with an estimated cost of $178 million. Construction began in August 2018 and is estimated to be complete in autumn 2021.
In the Richmond area, a project to widen I-64 to six lanes from exit 200 (I-295) in Henrico County to exit 205 (Bottoms Bridge) in New Kent County. The project was managed by Corman-Branch, a joint venture at an estimated cost of $43 million (equivalent to $ in ). Construction began in August 2017 and was completed in summer 2019.

Southside

This included replacing the functionally obsolete High Rise Bridge, which was completed one year after the study corridor opened, in 1969.

This study, completed in 2013, showed that the corridor frequently performed at near-failing levels of service (level of service grades D and E), with the High Rise Bridge itself outright failing, resulting in higher crash rates when compared to other areas in the region. This is because most of the interchange ramps were built to previous Interstate standards and were based on then-rural development in the Western Chesapeake and Eastern Suffolk. In addition, since the start of tolling at the Elizabeth River Tunnels, the High Rise Bridge and the corridor has received a nearly seven-percent increase in traffic during peak hours, further exacerbating the problem.

In March 2015, the CTB identified and approved of the addition of two lanes of capacity in each direction, with the possibility of them being either two HOT lanes, one HOV and one general-purpose lane, or all four lanes being tolled. Widening would be accomplished by adding the lanes in the median east of US 17 and to the outside shoulder west of US 17. The approved plan also calls for the construction of a new, four-lane  fixed-span bridge to the south of the current High Rise Bridge. Construction will be conducted in multiple phases, similar to the widening project on the Peninsula:
 The first phase of the project would widen I-64 to three lanes in each direction by adding the new lane to the median in both directions as a managed lane, begin the construction of the new High Rise Bridge, and replace and rehabilitate other existing bridges in the area. This segment is estimated to cost around $600 million.
 The second phase would see all six lanes of I-64 shifted to the newly constructed bridge while the old bridge is demolished and replaced with a new four-lane bridge that would eventually carry Inner Loop (I-64 west) traffic.
 The final phase would see the addition of the fourth lanes of traffic added to both directions and the shift of Inner Loop/I-64 west to the newly reconstructed bridge.
Once completed, the entire corridor would be an eight-lane stretch of highway, with two  fixed-span bridges. Estimated costs for the entire project are currently estimated at $2.3 billion. Currently, only part of first phase of the plan has been funded, which includes preliminary engineering and right-of-way service. A final design for the project is expected in December 2016, and a final contract award date is tentatively scheduled for August 2017.

I-64 Express Lanes 
State and regional leaders have come up to convert the region's  of existing high occupancy vehicle (HOV-2) lanes into high occupancy toll (HOT-2) lanes called the I-64 Express Lanes. According to a 2016 study by VDOT, only 1,600 vehicles travel through the Norfolk HOV lanes during the morning HOV restriction (6:00–8:00 am) and only 1,300 vehicles through the lanes through Virginia Beach and Chesapeake. The plans for the I-64 Express Lanes have been divided into individual segments, all of which have been endorsed by the regions transportation planning organization.

Segment 1 converted the two-lane reversible roadway in Norfolk between the I-64/I-564 interchange and the I-64/I-264 interchange to HOT-2 lanes. Inner Loop traffic (eastbound from Hampton through Norfolk) enters through the ramp just prior to the I-564 interchange and exits through either the left exit directly to I-264 east, the slip ramp back to the Inner Loop for the interchange to I-264 west, or continue straight into mainline Inner Loop on the other side of the interchange. Outer Loop (westbound from Chesapeake to Norfolk) traffic enters the lanes at the ramp just after the I-64 Twin Bridges at the Elizabeth River, I-264 west traffic (from Virginia Beach to Downtown Norfolk) uses the flyover ramp from mainline I-264 to the Express Lanes, and I-264 east traffic (from Downtown Norfolk to Virginia Beach) merges onto the Outer Loop and utilizes the slip ramp entry. Tolling is only operational from Monday–Friday from 5:00–9:00 am and from 2:00–6:00 pm. Minimum toll during these periods is $0.50 and increases proportionally to traffic. Toll gantry installation and conversion was completed January 10, 2018, slightly behind schedule.

Segment 2 would convert the single HOV-2 diamond lanes in each direction to HOT-2 lanes and would also include the newly expanded High Rise Bridge and associated lanes of I-64 from the I-464/I-64 interchange. Both directions would have a primary entrance/exit near the Bowers Hill interchange, with a midpoint entrance/exit near the Greenbrier Parkway/Battlefield Boulevard interchanges and a terminal entrance/exit that ties in at the Twin Bridges. These lanes would be continuously operational once activated and would be variably priced depending on the traffic in the general-purpose lanes. This segment is scheduled to be completed as part of the High Rise Bridge project, which is scheduled for completion in 2021.

Segment 3 would be built as part of the HRBT Expansion Project and would build from the existing reversible HOV northern terminus at I-564/I-64 through, across the expanded bridge–tunnel, and through the existing HOV-2 diamond lanes in Hampton. Planning for this segment (such as operational times and tolling pricing) will continue as the HRBT Expansion Project continues and would open at the same time as the new HRBT opens in 2024.

Segment 4 would convert the remaining diamond lanes on I-64 in Hampton & Newport News to HOT-2 lanes as an extension of the HRBT Expansion Project. Detailed studies for this project, including operational hours, planning, and design, will occur in 2018 and would open along with the completion of the HRBT Expansion Project.

Hampton Roads Bridge–Tunnel Expansion Project 
According to VDOT, in 1958, an average of 6,000 vehicles a day used the facility whereas an average of 88,000 vehicles a day were using the crossing in 2008, with volumes exceeding 100,000 during the tourist season, well exceeding the original design capacity of 77,000 vehicles per day, which sparked decades of debate on how to improve traffic flow at the region's most important water crossing. Studies into the growing traffic at the HRBT have roots back to the early 1990s. In 1992, the Virginia General Assembly had requested that VDOT study growing traffic at the HRBT. The conclusion of that study determined that a longterm large-scale solution to the problem would be required to alleviate backups. For the next 14 years, VDOT would undertake numerous studies in 1999, 2008, 2012, and 2016 to help choose a candidate build that was financially and physically feasible to build. On October 29, 2020, a groundbreaking ceremony was held in Hampton for the HRBT Expansion Project.

After nearly two decades of studies and planning, the CTB and the two regional boards responsible for the project (HRTPO/Hampton Roads Transportation Accountability Commission (HRTAC)) voted unanimously in 2016 to a $3.3-billion expansion of the current bridge–tunnel and its approaches from two to four lanes in both directions from the I-664 interchange to the I-564 interchange, with two new, two-lane bridge–tunnels built to carry traffic eastbound (Hampton to Norfolk). A final environmental impact statement (EIS) was published in May 2017, and the Record of Decision (ROD) from the Federal Highway Administration (FHWA) was granted in June. The project is expected to be completed by November 2025

Exit list

References

External links
Virginia Highways Project: I-64

64
Interstate 064
Interstate 064
Interstate 064
Interstate 064
Interstate 064
Interstate 064
Interstate 064
Interstate 064
Interstate 064
Interstate 064
Interstate 064
Interstate 064
Interstate 064
Interstate 064
Interstate 064
Interstate 064
Interstate 064
Interstate 064
Interstate 064
Interstate 064
Interstate 064
64
Movable bridges on the Interstate Highway System
Bridges completed in 1972
Bridges in Chesapeake, Virginia
Road bridges in Virginia
 Virginia
Bridges on the Interstate Highway System